The 2005 Sámi parliamentary election was held in Norway on September 12, 2005. Voters elected 43 members for the Sámi Parliament of Norway.

Constituencies
Norway was divided into 13 constituencies for the 2005 Sámi parliamentary election. For each, three representatives were elected. In addition an additional representative was elected from the four constituencies with the most votes. For the 2005 election, the constituencies were:

In the county of Finnmark:
 Várjjat (the municipalities of: Sør-Varanger, Unjárga (Nesseby), Vadsø, Vardø and Båtsfjord).
Representatives (2005-2009): Magnhild Mathisen, Gunn-Britt Retter, and Knut Store
 The highest electoral turnout in 2005 (79.1%).
 Deatnu (the municipalities of: Deatnu (Tana), Berlevåg and Gamvik).
Representatives (2005-2009): Marianne Balto Henriksen, Jánoš Trosten, and Per Ivar Henriksen.
 Kárášjohka (Karasjok) municipality.
Representatives (2005-2009): Egil Olli, Terje H. Tretnes, Synnøve Solbakken-Härkönen, and Marie Therese Nordsletta Gaup.
 Guovdageaidnu (Kautokeino) municipality.
Representatives (2005-2009):  Aili Keskitalo, Per Andersen Bæhr, Isak Mathis O. Hætta, and Klemet Erland Hætta.
The largest constituency in 2005 (1 313 eligible voters).
Most votes per members in 2005 election (277).
 Porsáŋgu (the municipalities of: Porsáŋgu (Porsanger), Lebesby, Nordkapp and Måsøy).
Representatives (2005-2009): Josef Ingmar Vedhugnes, Olaf Eliassen, and Wiebke Synnøve Slåtsveen.
 Áltá/Fálesnuorri (the municipalities of: Kvalsund, Hammerfest, Alta, Hasvik and Loppa).
Representatives (2005-2009): Per Edvind Varsi, John Harald Skum, Toril Bakken, and Inger Jørstad.

In the county of Troms:
 Davvi Romsa (Kvænangen, Nordreisa, Skjervøy, Gáivuotna (Kåfjord), Storfjord and Lyngen).
Representatives (2005-2009): Willy Ørnebakk, Tor Mikalsen, and Hilde Anita Nyvoll Vangen.
 Gaska Romsa (Karlsøy, Tromsø, Balsfjord, Målselv, Bardu, Lenvik, Berg, Torsken and Tranøy)
Representatives (2005-2009): Randi A. Skum, Bjarne Store-Jakobsen, and Lene Hansen.
 Lulli Romsa (Sørreisa, Dyrøy, Salangen, Lavangen, Gratangen, Skånland, Ibestad, Harstad, Bjarkøy and Kvæfjord).
Representatives (2005-2009): Ann-Mari Thomassen, Berit Oskal Eira, and Susanne Amalie Andersen.

In the county of Nordland:
 Davvi Nordland (Andøy, Øksnes, Bø, Sortland, Hadsel, Vågan, Vestvågøy, Flakstad, Moskenes, Værøy, Røst, Lødingen, Tjeldsund, Evenes and Narvik).
Representatives (2005-2009): Kjersti Myrnes Balto, Vibeke Larsen, and Roger Pedersen.
The smallest constituency in 2005 (283 eligible voters).
Fewest votes per members in 2005 election (63).
 Gaska Nordland (Ballangen, Tysfjord, Hamarøy, Steigen, Sørfold, Bodø, Fauske, Saltdal, Gildeskål, Beiarn, and Meløy).
Representatives (2005-2009): Tone Finnesen, Anders Urheim, and Miriam Paulsen.

For the remaining counties of southern Norway:
 Lullisámeguovllut (the remaining municipalities in Nordland, Engerdal municipality in Hedmark county,  and the counties of Nord-Trøndelag and Sør-Trøndelag).
Representatives (2005-2009): Jarle Jonassen, Sten Erling Jønsson, and Kirsten Appfjell.
 Lulli Norga (the counties of Hedmark (except Engerdal), Møre og Romsdal, Sogn og Fjordane, Hordaland, Rogaland, Vest-Agder, Aust-Agder, Telemark, Buskerud, Vestfold, Akershus, Østfold, Oppland and Oslo)
Representatives (2005-2009): Rita-Alise Porsanger, Jørn Are Gaski, Johan Mikkel Sara, and Kirsti Guvsám.
The lowest electoral turnout in 2005 (66.8%)

Outcome
The results of the vote where that:
Norwegian Sámi Association got 18 representatives (and for the first time did not have the majority in the parliament).
Labour Party also got 18 representatives.
Johttisápmelaččaid Listu, Åarjel læstoe, Sámi People's Party, Finnmark list, Dáloniid Listu, Centre Party, and an unaffiliated Sámi resident in Southern Norway each got 1 representative.

Since no party had a majority of the mandates a coalition was formed for the executive council consisting of: Norwegian Sámi Association, Sámi resident in Southern Norway, Johttisápmelaččaid Listu, Centre Party, and Sámi People's Party. Aili Keskitalo from the Norwegian Sámi Association was elected as the president. Johan Mikkel Sara, Sámi resident in Southern Norway, got the vice president position, while Per A. Bær got a seat in the board of the Finnmark Estate. The six members in the executive council consisted in addition to the president and vice-president of: Terje Tretnes (Sámi People's Party), Randi A. Skum, and Jarle Jonassen (the later both from Norwegian Sámi Association).

Later Jánoš Trosten left Norwegian Sámi Association and formed his own party, Čielga Sámi Jietna, while Anders Urheim left the Labour party and formed the Sosialdemokraten group. Thus leaving, the two largest parties with 17 mandates each.

After the election in 2005 Aili Keskitalo became president. She represents the Norwegian Sámi Association. On September 25 she resigned after the coalition forming the executive council was split up due to problems cooperating with vice president Johan Mikkel Sara.

On September 26, Labour Party formed an executive council consisting of: the new president Egil Olli, new vice-president Marianne Balto, Jørn Are Gaski, Hilde Nyvoll, and Vibeke Larsen. The Labour Party does not have the majority in the parliament.

Gender
One particularly remarkable facet of the Sámi parliamentary elections of 2005 was the outcome of 50% women being elected into parliamentary seats, as compared to the 37% of seats occupied by women in the non-Sámi Norwegian parliament. Through an active effort to foster women's participation in Sámi politics, no less than 22 women were elected to the 43 seats in the Sámi Parliament, up from 7 in 2001. Also in 2005, Aili Keskitalo, a woman, was elected as Parliamentary President, a position similar to Speaker of the House in the USA. She was the third parliamentary president of the Sámi Parliament of Norway and the first female president of any Sámi parliament, though she resigned in 2007 (see above). Taking her place was a man, Egil Olli, whereas the vice-president of parliament was a woman, Marianne Balto.

Results
Election results for the 2005 Sámi parliamentary election. Voter turnout was 71.2%.

See also
2005 Norwegian parliamentary election

References

Sami, 2005
Sámi in Norway
Norway
Sami parliamentary election
Norway
Norwegian Sámi parliamentary elections